The Treaty of Accession 2011 is an agreement between the member states of the European Union and Croatia concerning Croatia's accession to the EU. It was signed on 9 December 2011 in Brussels by the heads of state or government of the 27 member states and by the president of Croatia, Ivo Josipović, and Prime Minister Jadranka Kosor.

The Treaty entered into force on 1 July 2013, making Croatia the 28th Member state of the European Union although following the withdrawal of the United Kingdom in January 2020 Croatia then became the 27th Member state.

History

Croatia submitted its application to join the European Union on 21 February 2003, became an official candidate on 18 June 2004, and started accession negotiations on 3 October 2005.

On 24 June 2011, the European Council called for the finishing of negotiations by the end of the month, and signing of the Treaty of Accession by the end of the year. Negotiations were subsequently closed on 30 June 2011, and on 14 September 2011 the accession treaty was finalised and made public. On 12 October 2011 the European Commission delivered a favourable opinion on the accession of Croatia to the European Union. As a result, on 1 December 2011 the European Parliament gave assent to the application of Croatia to become member of the European Union. The parliament voted in favour with 564 positive votes, 38 negative votes and 32 abstentions.

The treaty was signed on 9 December 2011 in Brussels and entered into force on 1 July 2013, having been ratified by Croatia and the European Union's 27 member states.

The full official name of the treaty is:

The treaty, which is 250 pages long, provides for amendments to the treaties to add Croatian representatives into EU institutions (including transitional provisions before new elections take place) and outlines Croatia's various financial contributions. The document does not include a monitoring mechanism of Croatia by the European Commission to ensure continued reform, as was the case with Bulgaria and Romania. Two protocols promised to states during the ratification of the Treaty of Lisbon, one making several guarantees to Ireland and another granting an opt-out from the Charter of Fundamental Rights to the Czech Republic, were planned to be ratified alongside the accession treaty, but both were ultimately delayed.

In addition to the Treaty of Accession, a Final Act was signed. The Final Act registers the results of the accession negotiations, including declarations made by the parties. It also laid down arrangements for the period between signing and entry into force of the treaty.

List of signatories

Ratification
The treaty required ratification by all EU member states and Croatia, conforming to their respective constitutional provisions, and deposition of the ratification instruments with the Government of Italy by 30 June 2013 to come into force on 1 July 2013. This process was completed on 21 June 2013.

Summary

Ratification of the Treaty of Accession is summarized in the table below.

Slovenia
In July and September 2012, officials of the Slovenian Parliament and the Slovenian Ministry of Foreign Affairs stated that they would not ratify Croatia's Treaty of Accession until an agreement was reached on how to handle the debt of Slovenian bank Ljubljanska banka, which went bankrupt during the breakup of Yugoslavia, to its Croatian customers. In February 2013, representatives of all major parties in Slovenia agreed to approve Croatia's accession after experts and foreign ministers from both countries reached a compromise deal.  The Prime Ministers of Slovenia and Croatia signed a memorandum outlining the settlement on 11 March, with Janez Janša, Prime Minister of Slovenia, saying that ratification of the accession treaty would occur "within 30 days" of the signing of the memorandum.  On 2 April 2013, the Slovenian Parliament gave its consent to Croatia's accession.

See also

 Enlargement of the European Union
2013 enlargement of the European Union
Treaty of Accession (lists equivalent accession treaties for other new members)
Future enlargement of the European Union
 Membership of the European Union
European Integration#Membership in European Union agreements

Notes

References

2011
2011 in the European Union
2011 in Croatia
Treaties concluded in 2011
Treaties of Croatia
Treaties entered into force in 2013
Croatia and the European Union